Kalle Kauppi (10 March 1892, in Heinolan maalaiskunta – 29 October 1961) was a Finnish legal scholar and politician. He served as Minister of Trade and Industry from 7 October 1936 to 12 March 1937, and Minister of Education from 5 March 1943 to 17 November 1944. He was a member of the Parliament of Finland from 1943 to 1951, representing the National Progressive Party.

References

1892 births
1961 deaths
People from Heinola
People from Mikkeli Province (Grand Duchy of Finland)
National Progressive Party (Finland) politicians
Ministers of Trade and Industry of Finland
Ministers of Education of Finland
Members of the Parliament of Finland (1939–45)
Members of the Parliament of Finland (1945–48)
Members of the Parliament of Finland (1948–51)
People of the Finnish Civil War (White side)
Finnish people of World War II
Finnish legal scholars
University of Helsinki alumni